Apelsin (Estonian for Orange) was an Estonian band created in 1974 by Tõnu Aare. Their lyrics are in the Estonian and Russian languages. During the Soviet era their LP albums were issued by the Soviet music monopoly Melodiya. The Russian name of the band was Апельсин. In both Estonian and Russian, the band's name means orange (fruit). Many songs and much of the music of the band are satirical.

Members 
The original lineup consisted of Tõnu Aare, Ants Nuut, Harry Kõrvits and Jaan Arder. In 1975, Gunnar Kriik, Ivo Linna and Mati Nuude joined. During 1989–1999 the band was at its smallest, and three of the founding members, Tõnu, Ants, and Jaan, rarely played together. Jaan had joined the historical music band, Hortus Musicus and Ivo and Harry had joined the band, Rock Hotel. In 1999 Apelsin made a fresh start.

Recent line-up 
()
 Tõnu Aare – vocal, acoustic & electric guitar, harmonica, bouzouki                                                                                  
 Jaan Arder – vocal, acoustic guitar, mandolin, steel guitar
 Ants Nuut – trombone, tuba, vocal
 Aleksander Vilipere – percussion, vocal
 Allan Jakobi – accordion, keyboard.
 Hillar King – bass

Apelsin to Jos 
A Swedish manufacturer of juice, Brämhults, launched an advertising campaign in November 2009 called "Apelsin to Jos", which means literally "Orange to Juice" in Swedish. The slogan is a pun, and the campaign consists of the stunt of sending the band to a Nigerian town called Jos.

Discography 
The band released 4 LPs and several CDs.
 Apelsin XX, a 1994 CD released for the 20th anniversary of the band.
 Apelsin Boogie, a 1999 CD released for the 25th anniversary of the band.
 Apelsin № 1, a 2003 CD of 1974 songs. Label: Opus Est
 Apelsin 30, a 30th anniversary CD (2004) Label: Records 2000/Global Music Group

Note that Estonian LPs produced during Soviet rule were customarily credited in parallel in Estonian and in Russian.

Apelsin 1980 LP 
Catalog#: C60-07809 

Lineup
 Bass, piano – Gunnar Kriik
 Drums – Harry Kõrvits
 Guitar – Ivo Linna
 Guitar, harmonica – Tõnu Aare
 Trombone, vocals – Ants Nuut
 Violin, vocals – Jaan Arder
 Vocals – Mati Nuude

Side A
 Western (В стиле вестерна) (Tõnu Aare)
 Jambalaya (Джамбалайя) (Hank Williams, Estonian lyrics: Reet Linna)
 Capri saarel (На острове Капри) (melody: Wilhelm Grosz, lyrics: Jimmy Kennedy, Estonian lyrics: Artur Ranne)
 Roosi (Роози) (Folk song – Tõnu Aare)
 Rahvamatk (Туристы в походе) (Tõnu Aare)
 Purjed (Паруса) (Tõnu Aare)

Side B
 Suupillilugu (Губная гармошка) (Tõnu Aare)
 Tuukri Laul (Песня водолаза) (Tõnu Aare – Ott Arder)
 Hommik Keskturul (Утро на рынке) (Tõnu Aare)
 Hop-hopp (Хоп-хоп) (Tõnu Aare – Ott Arder)
 Armurõõm (Восторг любви) (melody: J. Martini, arranged by Jaan Arder, lyrics: unknown)
 Kaks punast huult (Пунцовые уста), tango (Вилольдо)
 Igatsus (Тоска) (Tõnu Aare)
 Suvepäeva rock (Летний рок-н-ролл) (Tõnu Aare)

Apelsin 1981 LP 
Catalog#: C60-15353 / 15978

Side A
 Illusioon (Иллюзия) (Tõnu Aare – Ott Arder)
 See viis (Этот напев) (José Feliciano – Henno Käo)
 Raamid (Рамы) (Gunnar Kriik – Ott Arder)
 Shakespeare (Шекспир) (G. Kajanus – Estonian lyrics Ott Arder)
 Leierkast (Шарманка) (Music & lyrics: Gunnar Kriik)

Side B
 Peeglid (Зеркала) (Gunnar Kriik – Ott Arder)
 Viis viimast (В числе пяти последних) (Joe Dolan /"16 Brothers"/ – Estonial lyrics: Priit Aimla)
 Saatuse laev (Корабль судьбы) (Merle Haggard – Henno Käo)
 Aeg ei peatu (Время не останавливается) (Tõnu Aare – Ott Arder)

Apelsin 1988 LP 
Catalog#: C60-26527-007

Side A
 Matkalaul
 Tartu levi!
 Miks nii kiiresti kõik muutub
 Roolivelled
 Jaaniöö, imede öö
Side B
 Orange blues
 Autoservice
 Keskea rõõmud
 Amorada
 Etüüd Nr. 17
 Popurrii

Apelsin 1989 LP 
Catalog#: С60 29169 009

Lineup
 Виновата бабушка (Granny is to blame) (Mati Nuude – А. Вишневецкий)
 Наступило время (Time has come) (R. Rudolf – Henno Käo)
 Кенгуру (Kangaroo) (И. Трунин – М. Райкин)
 Тико-тико (Tiko-tiko) (Ф. Абреу)
 Болота лени (Marshes of laziness) (Tõnu Aare – В. Сауткин)
 Весёлые соседи (Merry neighbours) (Tõnu Aare – М. Райкин)
 Музыкальный идол (Musical idol) (С. Касторский – Ю. Марцинкевич)
 Кантри (Country) (Ч. Бланк – У. Ванн)
 Эстонский танец (Estonian dance) (Tõnu Aare)
 Песенка туриста (Tourist's song) (Tõnu Aare – Б. Балясный)
 Навстречу ветру (To meet the wind) (Priit Pihlap – Ott Arder)
 Кошачьи заботы (Cat's troubles) (Tõnu Aare – М. Райкин)

Krugozor #11, 1978 
Catalog#: Г92-07048/1-1
Krugozor was a musical magazine with flexi-discs issued by Melodiya
The issue contained three songs by Apelsin:
 Himaalaja
 Western
 Karulaul

References

External links 
 Apelsin home page 
 Group page at estmusic.com, an Estonian music vendor
 
 

Musical groups established in 1974
Musical groups disestablished in 2021
Estonian rock music groups
1974 establishments in Estonia
2021 disestablishments in Estonia